Naón Isidro (born 12 November 1987) is an Argentine-Israeli association football player who has been a free agent since he was released from Hapoel Ashkelon in June 2011.

Playing career
Isidoro arrived in Israel and first trialled with Maccabi Netanya. Actor Dubie Gal acted as the players agent and suggested Isidoro trial with Netanya to one of the club's supporters. The club were short on strikers and were attracted by the prospect of Isidoro not counting as a foreigner because he is Jewish. Isidoro failed to impress then manager, Reuven Atar and the club decided not to sign him. Isidoro then joined Hapoel Haifa on trial before landing a spot with Hapoel Nazareth Illit.

After a year of playing in Nazareth Illit, Isidoro moved to Ashkelon to join Hapoel Ashkelon. Within a short time of starting there, Isidoro found himself in the middle of the Gaza War as bombs fell on the city. During the war, Isidoro provided interviews for the media in Argentina to give them a perspective of what was going on on the ground. It became too difficult for Isidoro that he moved to Tel Aviv until the war ended. While playing for Ashkelon, Isidoro developed a friendship and even lived together with fellow Argentine Jew, Bryan Man.
at June 2011 he was released from Hapoel Ashkelon and is currently a free agent.

Statistics

Footnotes

External links
 

1987 births
Living people
Argentine Jews
Jewish Argentine sportspeople
Jewish footballers
Argentine footballers
Argentine emigrants to Israel
Israeli Jews
Israeli footballers
Hapoel Nof HaGalil F.C. players
Hapoel Ashkelon F.C. players
Hapoel Marmorek F.C. players
Israeli people of Argentine-Jewish descent
Sportspeople of Argentine descent
Association football forwards